Píritu Islets (Spanish: Isletas de Píritu) are two small islands of the Caribbean, located northwest of Venezuela, in the eastern Anzoátegui state, specifically in the Fernando de Peñalver Municipality north of the town of Puerto Píritu.

See also
Geography of Venezuela

References

External links
Location map

Caribbean islands of Venezuela
Geography of Anzoátegui
Archipelagoes of Venezuela